WPF may refer to:

Computing
 WebSphere Partition Facility, an IBM facility
 Windows Presentation Foundation, a graphical subsystem for rendering user-interfaces in applications using Microsoft Windows

Sports and games
 Women's Professional Fastpitch, professional women's softball league
 World Pickleball Federation
 World Pump It Up Festival, an annual competition/event on the dance game Pump It Up

Other
 Western People's Front, a political party in Sri Lanka, active in the Western Province
 Wolf Preservation Foundation, an international non-profit organisation
 World Population Foundation, founded in 1987 in the Netherlands